Apollo 6 (April 4, 1968), also known as AS-502, was the third and final uncrewed flight in the United States' Apollo Program and the second test of the Saturn V launch vehicle. It qualified the Saturn V to be used on crewed missions, as happened for the first time on Apollo 8 in December 1968.

Apollo 6 was intended to demonstrate the ability of the Saturn V's third stage, the S-IVB, to propel itself and the Apollo spacecraft to lunar distances. Its components began arriving at the Kennedy Space Center in early 1967. Testing proceeded slowly, often delayed by testing of the Saturn V intended for Apollo 4—the inaugural launch of the Saturn V. After that uncrewed mission launched in November 1967, there were fewer delays, but enough so that the flight was postponed from March to April 1968.

The flight plan called for following trans-lunar injection with a direct return abort using the service module's main engine, with a flight time totaling about 10 hours. Instead, vibrations damaged some of the Rocketdyne J-2 engines in the second and third stages by rupturing internal fuel lines causing a second-stage engine to shut down early. An additional second-stage engine shut down early due to cross wiring with the other shutdown engine. The vehicle's onboard guidance system compensated by burning the second and third stages longer, although the resulting parking orbit was more elliptical than planned. The damaged third-stage engine failed to restart for trans-lunar injection. Flight controllers elected to repeat the flight profile of the previous Apollo 4 test, achieving a high orbit and high-speed return. Despite the engine failures, the flight provided NASA with enough confidence to use the Saturn V for crewed launches; a potential third uncrewed flight was cancelled.

Objectives

Apollo 6, the second test flight of the 
Saturn V launch vehicle, was intended to send a command and service module (CSM) plus a Lunar Test Article (LTA), a simulated lunar module (LM) with mounted structural vibration sensors, into a trans-lunar trajectory, with the boost from orbit to trans-lunar velocity powered by the Saturn V's third stage, the S-IVB. That trajectory, although passing beyond the orbit of the Moon, would not encounter it. The entire mission was to last about 10 hours.
 
The mission was intended to test the Saturn V launch vehicle's ability to send the entire Apollo spacecraft to the Moon—in particular, to test the stresses on the LM and the vibration modes of the entire Saturn V with near-full loads. With the spacecraft having been qualified for crewed flight through the Apollo 4 mission (the first flight of the Saturn V), the focus was on fully qualifying the launch vehicle. Nominal completion of planned mission events through attainment of the initial parking orbit, and the restarting of the S-IVB to propel the space vehicle towards the planned distance, beyond the Moon's orbit, was deemed sufficient to fulfill Apollo 6's main objectives.

Equipment 

Apollo 6's launch vehicle was designated AS-502, the second flight-capable Saturn V. Its payload included CSM-020, a Block I CSM that had some Block II modifications. The Block I CSM did not have the capability of docking with a Lunar Module, as the Block II did. Among the modifications to CSM-020 was a new crew hatch, intended to be tested under lunar return conditions. This new hatch replaced the one which was condemned by the Apollo 1 investigation board as too difficult to open in case of emergency, circumstances that had contributed to the deaths of three astronauts in the Apollo 1 fire of January 27, 1967. The command module used was CM-020; it carried a mission programmer and other equipment to allow it to be operated remotely.

The service module used was SM-014—the originally-planned SM for Apollo 6, SM-020, was used for Apollo 4 after its SM, SM-017, was damaged in an explosion and had to be scrapped. CM-014 was unavailable for flight as it was being used to aid the Apollo 1 investigation. Not all SM systems were activated for the short Apollo 6 mission: the radiators to remove excess heat from the electrical power system and the environmental control system were not connected.

Kenneth S. Kleinknecht, Command and Service Module manager at the Manned Spaceflight Center in Houston, was pleased with CSM-020 when it arrived at Kennedy Space Center from North American Aviation, the manufacturer, though he was upset it arrived wrapped in flammable mylar. In contrast with Apollo 1's ill-fated CSM, which arrived with hundreds of unresolved issues, CSM-020 had only 23, mostly routine problems.

Also flown on Apollo 6 was a lunar test article: a simulated lunar module, designated as LTA-2R. It included a flight-type descent stage without landing gear, its fuel tanks filled with a water–glycol mixture and freon in its oxidizer tanks. Containing no flight systems, its ascent stage was made of ballasted aluminum and instrumented to show vibration, acoustics and structural integrity. LTA-2R remained inside the Spacecraft-Lunar Module Adapter, numbered SLA-9, throughout the flight.

Preparation
The S-IC first stage arrived by barge on March 13, 1967, and was erected in the Vehicle Assembly Building (VAB) four days later; the S-IVB third stage and Instrument Unit computer both arrived on March 17. The S-II second stage was not yet ready and so the dumbbell-shaped spacer, used in preparation for Apollo 4 (which also had a delayed S-II), was substituted so testing could proceed. The spacer had the same height and mass as the S-II along with all the electrical connections. The S-II arrived May 24 and was stacked and mated into the rocket on July 7.

Apollo 6 saw the first use of the High Bay 3 of the VAB, and it was quickly discovered that its air conditioning facilities were inadequate. Portable high-capacity units were brought in to keep equipment and workers cool. There were delays in April as personnel and equipment were busy with Apollo 4, and not available for tests on Apollo 6. The S-II second stage arrived on May 25 and was erected in one of the VAB's low bays, but work on Apollo 6 continued to be plagued by delays, many occasioned by work on Apollo 4. The vehicle was erected on Mobile Service Launcher 2, but work on the launcher's arms, which would swing back at launch, proceeded slowly. Also slow to arrive was the CSM itself; the planned late-September arrival was pushed back two months.

After Apollo 4's launch on November 9, 1967, the pace of the Apollo 6 project picked up, but there remained many problems with flight hardware.
The CSM was erected atop the launch vehicle on December 11, 1967, and the spacecraft stack was rolled out to Launch Complex 39A on February 6, 1968. The rollout was an all-day affair and much of it was conducted in heavy rain. Because the crawler-transporter had to halt for two hours when communications failed, the vehicle did not arrive at the launch pad until it was dark. The mobile service structure could not be moved to the launch pad for two days due to high winds.

The flight readiness test concluded on March 8, 1968, and at a review held three days later, Apollo 6 was cleared for launch contingent on the successful completion of testing and some action items identified at the meeting. Launch was set for March 28, 1968, but was postponed to April 1 and then April 3 after problems with some guidance system equipment and with fueling. The countdown demonstration test began on March 24; although it was completed within a week, the launch had to be postponed one more time. On April 3, the final countdown began with liftoff scheduled for the following day. All subsequent problems were fixed during the built-in holds in the countdown and did not delay the mission.

Flight

Launch

Apollo 6 launched from Launch Complex 39A at Kennedy Space Center on April 4, 1968, at 7:00 am (1200 UT). For the first two minutes, the Saturn V launch vehicle behaved normally. Then, as the Saturn V's S-IC first stage burned, pogo oscillations shook the vehicle. The vehicle suffered no damage, other than the loss of one of the panels of the Spacecraft-Lunar Module Adapter (SLA).

NASA Associate Administrator for Manned Space Flight George Mueller explained the cause to a congressional hearing:

After the first stage was jettisoned, the S-II second stage began to experience problems with its J-2 engines. Engine number two had performance problems from 225 seconds after liftoff, abruptly worsening at T+319 seconds. At T+412 seconds the Instrument Unit shut it down altogether, and two seconds later, engine number three also shut down. The fault was in engine two, but due to cross-connection of wires, the command from the Instrument Unit also shut down engine three, which had been running normally. The Instrument Unit was able to compensate, and the remaining three engines burned for 58 seconds longer than planned. The S-IVB third stage also had to burn for 29 seconds longer than usual. The S-IVB also experienced a slight performance loss.

Orbit
This deviation from the flight plan did not preclude continuing the mission. During the first orbit, the S-IVB maneuvered, changing its attitude towards the horizon to qualify techniques that future astronauts could use in landmark tracking. Then, after the standard two orbits to assess the vehicle's readiness for trans-lunar injection (TLI), the S-IVB was ordered to restart, but failed to do so.

Deciding on a pre-planned alternate mission, the flight director, Clifford E. Charlesworth and his team in Mission Control chose to use the SM's Service Propulsion System (SPS) engine to raise the spacecraft into an orbit with a high apogee (point of furthest distance from Earth), with a low perigee that would result in re-entry, as had been done in Apollo 4. This plan would complete some of the mission objectives. The SPS engine burned for 442 seconds to get to the planned  apogee. There was now, however, not enough propellant to speed up the atmospheric reentry with a second SPS engine burn, and the spacecraft only entered the atmosphere at a speed of  instead of the planned  that would simulate a lunar return. While at high altitudes, the CM was able to return data on the extent to which future astronauts would be protected from the Van Allen Belts by the skin of the spacecraft.

Ten hours after launch, the CM landed  from the planned touchdown point in the North Pacific Ocean north of Hawaii, and was lifted on board the USS Okinawa. The SM was jettisoned just before reaching the atmosphere and burned up. The S-IVB's orbit gradually decayed and it reentered the atmosphere on April 26, 1968.

Aftermath
In a post-launch press conference, Apollo Program Director Samuel C. Phillips said, "there's no question that it's less than a perfect mission", but that the launch vehicle's reaching orbit despite the loss of two engines was "a major unplanned accomplishment". Mueller called Apollo 6 "a good job all around, an excellent launch, and, in balance, a successful mission ... and we have learned a great deal", but later stated that Apollo 6 "will have to be defined as a failure".

The phenomenon of pogo, experienced during the first stage of the flight, was well known. However, NASA thought that the Saturn V had been "detuned"—that is, prevented from vibrating at its natural frequencies. Soon after the Apollo 6 flight, NASA and its contractors sought to eliminate the problems for future flights, and about 1,000 government and industry engineers worked on the problem. To damp pressure oscillations in the J-2 engines, cavities in these systems were filled with helium gas shortly before takeoff as a shock absorber. 

The problems with the S-II and the S-IVB were traced to the J-2 engines, present in both stages. Tests showed that the spark igniters on the propellant lines could fail in low atmospheric pressure or in vacuum. This problem would not happen in ground testing, where the cold liquid gases passing through the propellant lines would induce a protective layer of frost; further, during such testing, liquid air was sprayed over the engines' exteriors, damping out any vibrations. In the vacuum of space, there was no such protection: the bellows adjacent to the spark igniters vibrated rapidly and failed at peak flow, causing a burn-through of the propellant lines. The bellows were eliminated and the lines strengthened. In Apollo 6's wake, NASA engineers debated whether to configure the spacecraft's emergency detection system to automatically abort in the event of excessive pogo; this plan was opposed by Director of Flight Crew Operations Deke Slayton. Instead, work began on having a "pogo abort sensor" to allow the flight crew to judge whether to abort, but by August 1968, it had become clear that pogo could be dealt with without such a sensor, and work on it was abandoned.

The SLA problem was caused by its honeycomb structure. As the rocket accelerated through the atmosphere, the cells expanded due to trapped air and water, causing the adapter surface to break free. In response, engineers drilled small holes in the surface to allow trapped gases to dissipate, and placed a thin layer of cork on the adapter to help absorb moisture.

NASA's efforts were enough to satisfy the Senate Committee on Aeronautical and Space Sciences. In late April, the committee reported that the agency had quickly analyzed and diagnosed the abnormalities of Apollo 6, and had taken corrective action. After detailed analysis of the Saturn V's performance, and of the fixes for future launch vehicles, engineers at the Marshall Space Flight Center in Alabama concluded that a third uncrewed test flight of the Saturn V was unnecessary. Therefore, the next Saturn V to fly, on Apollo 8, would carry a crew (Apollo 7, the first crewed Apollo mission to fly, would be launched by a Saturn IB).

After the mission, CM-020 was transferred to the Smithsonian Institution. The Apollo 6 command module is on display at the Fernbank Science Center in Atlanta, Georgia.

Cameras

The Saturn V had several cameras affixed to it, intended to be ejected and later recovered. Three of the four cameras on board the S-IC failed to eject and thus were destroyed, and only one of the two cameras on the S-II was recovered. Two of these cameras were intended to film the S-IC/S-II separation and the other two were to film the liquid oxygen tank; the one that was recovered had filmed separation. The failure to eject was attributed to a lack of nitrogen pressure in the bottles that were to cause the ejection. The command module carried a motion picture camera, intended to be activated during launch and during re-entry. Because the mission took about ten minutes longer than planned, re-entry events were not filmed.

A 70 mm still camera operated in the CM during part of the mission, pointed at the Earth through the hatch window. Coverage included parts of the United States, the Atlantic Ocean, Africa, and the western Pacific Ocean. The camera had haze-penetrating film and filter combination, with better color balance and higher resolution than photographs taken on previous American crewed missions. These proved excellent for cartographic, topographic, and geographic studies.

Public impact
There was little press coverage of the Apollo 6 mission mainly because on the same day as the launch, Martin Luther King Jr. was assassinated in Memphis, Tennessee, and President Lyndon B. Johnson had announced he would not seek reelection only four days earlier.

See also
Splashdown (spacecraft landing)

References

Sources

External links
 "Apollo 6" at NASA's National Space Science Data Center
 Fernbank Science Center
 Apollo 6 16 mm on-board film. Part 1, Part 2, Part 3, Part 4, Part 5 raw film footage taken during the Apollo 6 mission

Apollo 06
1968 in the United States
Spacecraft launched in 1968
April 1968 events
Spacecraft launched by Saturn rockets